Aron Bjarnason (born 14 October 1995) is an Icelandic professional football player who plays for Sirius in the Swedish Allsvenskan.

Club career
In 2019 he was signed by Nemzeti Bajnokság I club Újpest FC. In 2020, he was sent on a season-long loan to Valur in his home country of Iceland. In February 2021, he was signed by Sirius.

Club statistics
Updated to games played as of 7 February 2021.

a. Icelandic League Cup

b. 6 games and 1 goal in Icelandic League Cup and 1 game in Icelandic Men's Football Super Cup.

References

External links

1995 births
Living people
Aron Bjarnason
Aron Bjarnason
Aron Bjarnason
Association football forwards
Aron Bjarnason
Aron Bjarnason
Aron Bjarnason
Újpest FC players
IK Sirius Fotboll players
Aron Bjarnason
Nemzeti Bajnokság I players
Allsvenskan players
Aron Bjarnason
Expatriate footballers in Hungary
Aron Bjarnason
Expatriate footballers in Sweden
Aron Bjarnason